Markwin Tee is a Filipino ten-pin bowler. He finished in 9th position of the combined rankings at the 2006 AMF World Cup.

External links
 Official Websites of the Philippine Bowling Congress

Living people
Year of birth missing (living people)
Filipino ten-pin bowling players
Place of birth missing (living people)
Bowlers at the 2006 Asian Games
Southeast Asian Games gold medalists for the Philippines
Southeast Asian Games silver medalists for the Philippines
Southeast Asian Games medalists in bowling
Competitors at the 2005 Southeast Asian Games
Asian Games competitors for the Philippines